Silver Terrace is a neighborhood in the south eastern corner of San Francisco, between the Bayview and Portola neighborhoods. It is roughly bordered by Third Street to the east, Palou Avenue and Silver Avenue to the north, Williams Avenue to the south and Bayshore Boulevard and U.S. Route 101 to the west. A tunnel used by Caltrain runs under Silver Terrace.

References

Neighborhoods in San Francisco